Tom Williams (born 30 July 1996) is a Welsh rugby union player who plays for the Ospreys as a wing. Born in Shrewsbury, England, he was a Wales under-20 and Wales Sevens international.

Williams made his debut for the Ospreys in 2017 having previously played for the Ospreys academy, RGC 1404, Swansea RFC and the Ospreys Development team. He made his Pro14 debut on 8 September 2018 against the Cheetahs.

References

External links 
Ospreys Player Profile

1996 births
Living people
Ospreys (rugby union) players
Rugby union players from Shrewsbury
Welsh rugby union players
Rugby union wings